The 2013 season for  began in January with the Tour Down Under. As a UCI ProTeam, they were automatically invited and obligated to send a squad to every event in the UCI World Tour.

On 25 June 2012, it was announced that the Russian Tinkoff Bank would join the team as co-sponsors for the rest of the 2012 season and through to the end of 2013. Saxo Bank also renewed their sponsorship through 2013, with the team's name thus becoming Saxo-Tinkoff.

2013 roster
As of 6 August 2013.

Riders who joined the team for the 2013 season

Riders who left the team during or after the 2012 season

Season victories

Footnotes

References

2013 road cycling season by team
Tinkoff (cycling team)
2013 in Danish sport